Erich Jaschke (11 May 1890 – 18 October 1961) was a general in the Wehrmacht of Nazi Germany during World War II who commanded the 20th Infantry Division and late the LV. Army Corps. He was a recipient of the Knight's Cross of the Iron Cross with Oak Leaves.

Awards and decorations
 Iron Cross (1914) 2nd Class (5 November 1914) & 1st Class (5 April 1915)
 Honour Cross of the World War 1914/1918
 Clasp to the Iron Cross (1939) 2nd Class (31 May 1940) & 1st Class (8 July 1941)
 Knight's Cross of the Iron Cross with Oak Leaves
 Knight's Cross on 4 December 1941 as Oberst and commander of Infanterie-Regiment 90
 295th Oak Leaves on 7 September 1943 as General der Infanterie and commander of LV. Armeekorps

References
Citations

Bibliography

1890 births
1961 deaths
Generals of Infantry (Wehrmacht)
German Army personnel of World War I
German prisoners of war in World War II held by the United States
Military personnel from Gdańsk
People from West Prussia
Prussian Army personnel
Recipients of the clasp to the Iron Cross, 1st class
Recipients of the Knight's Cross of the Iron Cross with Oak Leaves
Reichswehr personnel
German Army personnel of World War II